Periplum is defined in the Oxford English Dictionary as being "[o]riginally and chiefly in the poetry of Ezra Pound," and as being equivalent in meaning to the English word "periplus." The word is derived from the Greek  περι (a prefix meaning around or about) + πλοῦς (voyage). As a noun, Pound uses "periplum" simply to refer to a voyage or journey, as in canto 74, line 3: "The great periplum brings in the stars to our shore." Here the "great periplum" refers to the daily journey made by the Sun God, Helios. "Periplum" is also used in The Cantos adverbially, as we see in this example from canto 59:

Periplum, not as land looks on a map 
But as sea bord seen by men sailing.  (Line 82-4)

In his book ABC of Reading, Pound describes the geography of Homer's Odyssey as "correct geography; not as you would find it if you had a geography book and a map, but as it would be in 'periplum,' that is, as a coasting sailor would find it."  That is to say that Homer's geography is understood from the point of view of a sailor who is actually "in periplum" or in the midst of the voyage itself. In The Cantos, Pound similarly perceives space from the point of view of a poet in the midst of experience rather than from an a posteriori position.

Gabriel Levin: "One more night crossing, one more periplum..."

Periplum is the name of an England-based site-responsive theatre company. (http://www.periplum.co.uk/)

References

Ezra Pound